Redneck Crazy is the debut studio album by American country music artist Tyler Farr. It was released on September 30, 2013 via Columbia Nashville. Reviews for the record were mixed, with critics giving note to the lyrical content having various country music clichés. Redneck Crazy debuted at numbers two and five on the Top Country Albums and Billboard 200 charts, respectively. It spawned four singles: "Hot Mess", "Hello Goodbye", the title track, and "Whiskey in My Water".

Singles
The album's first single, "Hot Mess" was released on February 6, 2012 but only reached number 49 on both the Billboard Country Airplay and Hot Country Songs charts, respectively. A second single, "Hello Goodbye", was released on August 27, 2012 but was only able to peak at numbers 47 and 52 on both the Billboard Hot Country Songs and Country Airplay charts, respectively. A music video for the single, directed by Darrin Dickerson, premiered in November 2012. The third single, the title track, peaked at numbers two and three on both the Billboard Hot Country Songs and Country Airplay charts, respectively. It was certified platinum by the Recording Industry Association of America (RIAA) on October 28, 2013. Its music video was directed by Jeff Venable and premiered on April 17, 2013. The fourth and final single, "Whiskey in My Water", was released on November 4, 2013 and reached numbers three and 11 on both the Billboard Country Airplay and Hot Country Songs charts, respectively. It was also certified platinum by the Recording Industry Association of America (RIAA) on February 7, 2018. The single's music video was directed by Chris Hicky and premiered on January 28, 2014.

Reception

Redneck Crazy received mixed reviews from music critics. Jon Freeman of Country Weekly thought that the album contained several "rural tropes" that "wear out their welcome later in the album", but thought that most of the songs were "interesting" for their lyrical content and Farr's "raspy, expressive voice". Matt Bjorke of Roughstock wrote that Farr's "strong, likable voice [that] is put to ample use on the eleven tracks held within and it also suggests there's even more to the man that we've only scratched the surface of." AllMusic's Stephen Thomas Erlewine was critical of the album containing country music clichés and production that's indebt to hip-hop but gave note of Farr's performance sounding "freshly showered and eminently respectable," concluding that "[T]his inherent politeness does mean his rowdy redneck ways feel a bit like schtick, but it's a good act performed with enough cheer that Farr's slickness sells Redneck Crazy whenever the tunes drift toward the generic." Jeffrey B. Remz of Country Standard Time criticized the overall content for utilizing "the three most standard clichés in country music" found in "Chicks, Trucks and Beer" and Farr's vocal delivery for being too hip-hop influenced and "raspy", concluding that "In reality, there's not a whole lot of excitement. Not when you're considering that Farr is trailing the pack, not trying to lead it."

In 2017, Billboard contributor Chuck Dauphin placed four tracks from the album on his top 10 list of Farr's best songs: "Hello Goodbye" at number one, the title track at number two, "Living with the Blues" at number six and "Hot Mess" at number seven.

Redneck Crazy debuted on the Billboard 200 at number five, and the Top Country Albums chart at number two, selling 29,000 copies in its first week and being the highest-charting debut by a new male country artist in two years. On the Billboard 200, it left the top 100 on the week of November 16, 2013, spending eight weeks on the chart. The album has sold 187,000 copies in the US as of May 2015.

Track listing

Personnel
Credits adapted from the liner notes of Redneck Crazy.

Vocals

Rhett Akins background vocals
Jim Catino crowd noise
Perry Coleman background vocals
Tyler Farr lead vocals, background vocals
Whitney Farr crowd noise
Colt Ford duet vocals on "Chicks, Trucks, and Beer"

Tania Hancheroff background vocals
Wes Hightower background vocals
Julian King crowd noise
Ben Maki crowd noise
Haley McLemore crowd noise
Risha Rodgers crowd noise

Musicians

Mike Brignardello bass guitar
Jim "Moose" Brown keyboards
Jake Burns electric guitar
Howard Duck keyboards
Dan Dugmore dobro, electric guitar, steel guitar, mandolin
Shannon Forrest drums
Kenny Greenberg electric guitar
Tony Harrell – keyboards

Julian King drum programming, percussion, synthesizer
David LaBruyere bass guitar
Troy Lancaster electric guitar
B. James Lowry acoustic guitar, resonator guitar
Jerry McPherson electric guitar
Jeff Roach synthesizer
Channing Wilson acoustic guitar
Glenn Worf bass guitar

Charts

Weekly charts

Year-end charts

Release history

References

2013 debut albums
Tyler Farr albums
Columbia Records albums
Albums produced by Julian King (recording engineer)